Lake Rebecca is a lake in Hennepin County, in the U.S. state of Minnesota.

Lake Rebecca was named for Rebecca Allen, the wife of Samuel Allen.

See also
List of lakes in Minnesota

References

Lakes of Minnesota
Lakes of Hennepin County, Minnesota